Mount Bachelor ski resort (stylized as Mt. Bachelor) is a ski resort located in Central Oregon, approximately  west of Bend, along Century Drive Highway. The ski area is on the northern side of Mount Bachelor, a stratovolcano rising atop a volcanic shield in the Cascade Range.

Since 2001, the ski area has been owned by Powdr Corporation of Park City, Utah.

Mount Bachelor offers one of the nation's longest ski seasons, mid-November through the end of May (weather permitting).

History 
The Mount Bachelor Ski Area was founded by former 10th Mountain Division Elite Force ski trooper Bill Healy (1925–1993) on December 19, 1958, with $75,000 (equivalent to $ today) and a one-year lease from the U.S. Forest Service for the land. The four other major stockholders were Felix Marcoulier (1917–2004), Dr. Bradford Pease (1912–2004), Oscar Murray (–present), and Phil Gould.  The founders raised $100,000 from local investors and made many important management decisions that would shape the path of Mount Bachelor and Central Oregon for decades to come.

The ski area opened as Bachelor Butte in October 1958 with a rope tow and a -long platter lift rising ; a lift ticket was three  (equivalent to $ today). The name of the volcano was changed to Mount Bachelor in 1983 after the Bend Chamber of Commerce persuaded state and federal officials to adopt the more descriptive term  Well-known broadcaster and avid skier Lowell Thomas visited the young ski area in 1961, flying over from Sun Valley with agribusiness magnate 

The first chairlift was "black chair" in 1961, shortly followed by "red chair" in 1964. In 1967 and 1970, the yellow and blue chair lifts were added, and in 1973 the green and orange chair lifts were added. The "Outback chair" was added in 1976, "Rainbow" in 1980, and "Sunrise" in 1982. The first area of the mountain developed for skiing was the northeastern side. The northwestern side was not lift-served in 1973, but those who ventured for the "Outback Trail Tour" paid a dollar in advance and got a return ride by a snowcat to the lodge. A new trail was finished in 1975, and the Outback double chairlift was installed at a cost of $700,000. It was replaced by the $3 million high-speed quad (Outback Express) in the summer of 1987; with a capacity of 2,800 passengers per hour. The -long Northwest Express chairlift was added in 1996, a high-speed quad with  vertical. In 1976, Mount Bachelor had a severe drought and was only open January 2 through February 14, and February 26 through April 30. There was a loss of an estimated $4 million which took four years to recover. Following the drought, the Nordic initiative began and the main lodge expanded.

Plans for the first summit chairlift were announced in autumn 1979; the high-speed detachable triple was installed in the summer of 1983. At the time, it was just the second detachable chairlift installed in the world. It was upgraded to a quad in 1997. Original plans for a summit lodge and an accompanying service road were abandoned in 1982 to attain approval from the U.S. Forest Service.

Due to its challenging terrain parks and excellent snow conditions, Mount Bachelor is the official home training resort of many professional and Winter Olympic athletes, and hosts several professional USSA competitions each year.

On April 4, 1968, a single-engine light airplane crashed on the slopes of Mount Bachelor with three fatalities. Bound for Eugene from Boise and Billings, it was found three days later at the  level by skiers after a multi-day regional air search in limited visibility.

Terrain
As one of the tallest mountains in the vicinity, Mount Bachelor often experiences high wind speeds causing the chairlift to the summit to be put on standby.

Trails and lifts

There are 12 chairlifts:  Alpenglow, Early Riser, Northwest Express, Outback Express, Pine Marten Express, Rainbow Chair, Red Chair, Skyliner Express, Summit Express, Sunrise Express, Little Pine, and Cloudchaser. Northwest Express, Outback Express, Pine Marten Express, Skyliner Express, Summit Express, Sunrise Express, and Little Pine  are express quads.

Following the Summit triple in 1983, the Pine Marten was the first express quad, installed in the summer of 1986. The accompanying lodge at the top of Pine Marten was built two years later. The Pine Marten Express was the world's first height-adjustable detachable quad. It was overhauled in 2006 for $3.5 million, with new terminals, cable, and all new moving parts. The Outback Express was installed in 1987 and the Skyliner Express in 1989.

Mount Bachelor has outlined in its master plan that it intends to replace its Sunrise Express to a high-speed six-pack, along with replacing its Rainbow triple chairlift with a high-speed quad. In addition, the ski area plans to expand its downhill mountain bike terrain and install a zip-line.

In the early 1990s, Mount Bachelor had intentions of installing an 8 passenger high speed gondola which would run from the Sunriver access road. However, while marketed in ski magazines, this gondola was never built.

In recent years, Mount Bachelor has made sweeping efforts to attract freestyle skiers and snowboarders.  A  super pipe is among the best on the continent, and hosted the 2006 USSA Olympic Qualifier.  The resort's Bachelor Parks terrain park encompasses 3 parks, is nearly a mile (1.5 km) long, descending 850 vertical feet (260 m) and featuring a number of jumps, rails, boxes, and jibs for freestyle riders.  Other parks include "Slopestyle Arena", and "Sunshine Park" for beginners.

In 2003, Transworld Snowboarding magazine (editors & readers) ranked  Bachelor as the fourth best snowboarding resort in North America.

Mount Bachelor also has a cross country skiing area with 12 groomed trails covering 35 miles (56 km) and 850 feet (260 m) of vertical.

Activities
Skiing/ Snowboarding

Mount Bachelor offers lift accessed skiing and snowboarding seven days a week from late-November to the end of May.  Hours are generally 9:00 a.m. to 4:00 p.m.  On nice weather days Mount Bachelor offers skiing 360 degrees off the summit of the mountain. Bachelor holds some of the driest snow relative to the Cascades. The mountain's wide variety of elevation and aspect allows skiers and snowboarders to find good snow nearly every day of the season. Many avid skiers and snowboarders can access a bulge on the north side of the mountain referred to as 'the cone' by hiking before, during and after the resorts typical hours of operation.

Nordic skiing

Mount Bachelor has the longest groomed Nordic season in North America, running from late-November through late-May.  Snow conditions may extend into June.

Mountain bike park

Starting in the summer of 2013, Mount bachelor was granted a special use permit from the Forest Service allowing chairlift for downhill mountain bike laps.  Mountain bike trail continue to be developed, varying from a family-friendly single track trail to "bad to the bone" downhill bike park.

Other features at Mount Bachelor include snowshoeing, dog sledding, and on-mountain interpretive tours.  Seven restaurants, three bars, and three coffeehouses on the premises are distributed in three day lodges.  Additional accommodations and lodging are nearby at Sunriver and in the city of Bend.

U.S. Ski Team
Kiki Cutter (b. 1949), five World Cup victories, 1968 Olympian, runner-up in World Cup slalom standings and fourth overall in 1969
Tommy Ford (b. 1989), World Cup racer, 2010 Olympian, eight U.S. Alpine titles
Mike Lafferty, (b. 1948), 1972 Olympian, third in World Cup downhill standings and ninth overall in 1972
Laurenne Ross (b. 1988), World Cup racer, 10th in downhill at the 2011 World Championships

Resort statistics

Skier visits
Number of guests per day.

Elevation
Summit: 
Base: 
Lift-served
Maximum:  - top of Summit Express
Minimum:  - base of Northwest Express
Vertical drop:

Trails
Skiable area:  accessible by lift, with  groomed daily
Trails: 101 total 15% Novice 25% Intermediate 35% Advanced 25% Expert
Longest run: 
Average annual snowfall:  
Terrain Parks: 15 (Woodward Mountain Parks, Slopestyle, and Sunshine)
 Including 1 Superpipe

Lifts
14 Total
8 Express Quads
Pine Marten Express - (2006, 1986) 
Outback Express - (1987) 
Sunrise Express - (1993) 
Skyliner Express - (1989) 
Summit Express - (1997, 1983 (express triple)) 
Little Pine Express (formerly Sunshine Accelerator) - (1993) 
Northwest Express - (1996) 
Cloudchaser Express - (2016)  - Opened 12/16/2016
1 quad chairlift
Early Riser
3 triple chairlifts
Alpenglow (formerly Carrousel)
Rainbow
Red Chair
3 magic carpets
Chipmunk
First Rays
Lava Tube

Lift specifications

References

External links

Ski Lifts.org - photos of lifts at Mount Bachelor
Oregon History.org - history of Bachelor Butte ski area
 Historic Photo Archive - Bachelor Butte parking lot in 1963 on November 10

1958 establishments in Oregon
Buildings and structures in Deschutes County, Oregon
Ski areas and resorts in Oregon
Tourist attractions in Deschutes County, Oregon